The Light Rail Transit (LRT) is a series of localised automated guideway transit systems acting as feeder services to the heavy rail Mass Rapid Transit, which together forms the core of Singapore's rail transport services. The first LRT line was opened in 1999 and the system has since expanded to three lines, each serving a public housing estate, namely Bukit Panjang LRT line, Sengkang LRT line and Punggol LRT line. Trains on these lines have at least one station interchange link to the MRT.

In the conventional definition of LRT, it refers to an upgraded form of tram that uses articulated low-floor tram cars and partial grade separation; in some cases such as Rapid KL in Kuala Lumpur and the Docklands Light Railway, LRT refers to a medium-capacity rail-based light metro system. Unlike the aforementioned examples, Singapore's LRT system uses rubber-tired automated guideway transit trains that are more comparable to those found in airport people mover systems.

Along with the MRT, the LRT is constructed and owned by the Land Transport Authority, with operating concessions currently handed to SMRT Trains Ltd and SBS Transit Ltd. With the completion of Singapore's three LRT lines, there are no plans for further LRT networks in the future, aside from linking existing LRT stations to newer MRT lines.

History

Conception
In September 1991, the Urban Redevelopment Authority (URA) unveiled the revised Concept Plan 1991, which proposed a new mode of feeder rail that could serve new towns such as Yishun and Tampines. Such systems were to be fully automated and elevated light rail systems to serve as faster alternatives to existing feeder buses.

In 1994, then Communications Minister Mah Bow Tan tasked the Mass Rapid Transit Corporation (MRTC) to study the use of an LRT in Singapore, particularly as an internal feeder service for new towns. In particular, two towns, Bukit Panjang and Sengkang, were to be studied for the feasibility of the LRT. MRTC also commissioned British consultant, Oscar Faber TPA, to conduct a feasibility study for an LRT system in the Beach Road/Nicoll Highway corridor in anticipation of the increased demand for transport services in the area due to several major developments such as Suntec City, Marina Centre and Shenton Way. On 3 December that year, Mah announced the government's intentions to pilot two LRT systems at Bukit Panjang and Buona Vista. New LRT systems were also suggested for more mature towns such as Toa Payoh although further decisions were only to be made after the pilot programmes were conducted. Eventually, the proposed LRT around Buona Vista was cancelled due to insufficient demand for the rail line.

In 1995, study trips were made to the SK and Véhicule Automatique Léger (VAL) systems in France to study on the feasibility of building LRT systems near HDB public flats and integration of the LRT with other public transport modes as well as the H-Bahn suspended monorail system in Germany to study into the possibility of implementing such a system for Singapore Polytechnic and the National University of Singapore.

In 1996, the Land Transport Authority (LTA), which was formed from the merger of several transport statutory boards including MRTC in 1995, published a White Paper which outlined its goals for a world-class transport system in Singapore, one of which was the utilisation of LRT systems as feeder services to the MRT network, and the integration of LRT facilities with HDB estates to maximise convenience for residents.

In addition to using the LRT system as feeder service, the government also studied into the feasibility of using it to connect neighbouring towns with one another, such as Bedok-Tampines, Ang Mo Kio-Bishan-Toa Payoh, and the Jurong areas.

Punggol LRT line North Branch 
A North Branch consisting of two to four LRT stations for the Punggol LRT line had been planned, which would have brought commuters from Punggol LRT station via Sam Kee and Teck Lee LRT station before branching out from the West Loop tracks onto this branch, terminating near Coney Island. The branch was never built, but only visible in the planning stages of Punggol LRT since 2000.

The North Branch was therefore replaced by Punggol Coast MRT station and the bus interchange in 2013 which better serve future residents in the area.

Jurong Region LRT line 
A light rail network was proposed in 2001 which would have served the western regions of Singapore such as Jurong. It was also envisioned to serve commuters travelling to Nanyang Technological University (NTU). However, the LTA announced in 2008 that there were no plans for the line to be built. The project was later revived with the release of the Land Transport Master Plan 2013, in the form of the Jurong Region MRT line. It is set to open in stages from 2027 to 2029.

Opening of lines
The Bukit Panjang LRT line opened on 6 November 1999, with all 14 stations opening at the same time. Ten Mile Junction LRT station was closed from 10 December 2010 till 30 December 2011 for retrofitting works due to the closure and redevelopment of Ten Mile Junction shopping mall (now known as Junction 10), making it the first MRT/LRT station to be completely closed in Singapore after opening. The station was closed permanently from 13 January 2019 due to low demand. The closure of the station also led to the cessation of Bukit Panjang LRT Service C, formerly running from this station and looping in Bukit Panjang town via Senja. The vacated station will therefore be converted to Ten Mile Junction Depot Extension.[3][4] This was also the first ever MRT and LRT station in Singapore's history to be permanently closed and removed from operations.It is the first and only LRT line to be operated by SMRT Light Rail.

The Sengkang LRT line opened in two main stages, the East Loop opening first on 18 January 2003 and most of the West Loop on 29 January 2005. Farmway LRT station on the West Loop subsequently opened on 15 November 2007. On 1 January 2013, Cheng Lim LRT station opened for passenger service and the west loop now operated in both directions. The last station on the line to be opened, Kupang opened for passenger service on 27 June 2015.

For the Punggol LRT line, the East Loop started operating on the same day as the Sengkang LRT's West Loop, with two stations closed. Oasis LRT station was opened for service on 15 June 2007, after more residents moved into HDB flats in the station's vicinity. Damai LRT station opened on 20 June 2011. The West Loop opened on 29 June 2014 at 11.15 am, with Nibong, Sumang and Soo Teck being the first stations to open. Sam Kee, Punggol Point and Samudera opened on 29 February 2016, 29 December 2016 and 31 March 2017 respectively. Teck Lee LRT station will remain closed until the area around the station has been developed.

Improvements

Bukit Panjang LRT

For the Bukit Panjang LRT line, SMRT and LTA announced plans to completely overhaul the BPLRT system as the system is reaching its lifespan of 20 years.
Transport Minister Khaw Boon Wan has also announced plans to shut the Bukit Panjang LRT down for a small number of years to pave the way for the system's overhaul. On 23 October 2017, SMRT announced that the Bukit Panjang Light Rail Transit (BPLRT) system will begin operations at 7 am, instead of 5.30am, on all Sundays from 12 November 2017 until the end of the year, to allow more time for works to improve service reliability.

On 23 March 2018, SMRT said that the Bukit Panjang LRT line will be closed on 11 Sundays from 15 April 2018 to 24 June 2018 as part of maintenance works aimed to improve the reliability of the beleaguered system.

On 21 June 2018, SMRT said from 1 July 2018 to 28 October 2018, all BPLRT stations will open on Sundays at 8am, instead of the usual 5.30am.

On 12 January 2019, Ten Mile Junction served its last passengers and closed on the next day, 13 January 2019. It also marks the end of Service C on the Bukit Panjang LRT.

Sengkang-Punggol LRT

On 31 October 2012, LTA announced that by 2016, Sengkang and Punggol LRT systems will be upgraded to a two-car system for 16 of the 41 existing train cars, allowing double the number of passengers to board at any one time. Each train car can take up to 105 passengers. Hence, there is also the need to modify the signaling and communication system.

On 22 December 2015, the two-car trains entered service on the Sengkang LRT line, boosting capacity to 204 per trip as compared to 105 in a single car configuration.

As of 2017, two car trains have entered service on the Punggol LRT line.

On 15 December 2017, the Land Transport Authority said there will be limited services on parts of the Sengkang-Punggol LRT (SPLRT) on most Sundays from 14 January 2018 to 25 February 2018, to facilitate renewal and improvement works from (except 18 February as it was a Chinese New Year holiday). Only one platform will open for service at 5.30am on Sundays. The other platform will open from 7am. The arrangement continued until 29 April 2018.

On 14 February 2018, the LTA announced that it has taken over SBS Transit's rail assets (the North East MRT line and Sengkang-Punggol LRT lines) worth $30.8 million and transit to the New Rail Financing Framework on 1 April 2018. The LTA has also said that this will benefit commuters as there will be "more coordinated and timely expansion, and renewal of the rail system".

From 27 May 2018 to 7 October 2018, limited services on Sundays will continue on the Sengkang-Punggol LRT (SPLRT). One platform will open at 5.30am and the other platform will open at 5.30pm.

On 5 February 2021, the Land Transport Authority announced that it has purchased 17 two-car trains for the Sengkang and Punggol LRT systems. The new trains will be delivered progressively from 2024 to 2027. In addition to new trains, the Sengkang Depot will also be expanded to 11.1 ha from the existing 3.5 ha to ensure that is capacity and maintenance space for the new trains. The expansion of the depot will also see two new reception tracks being built to shorten the train launching time. To ensure there is enough electricity to support the larger fleet of trains, 3 new power stations will be built, increasing the total number of power stations supporting the system to 8 once completed.

Infrastructure

Network

Facilities

Since the LRT system was built in the 1990s, plans for barrier-free facilities have already been included during the planning stages. All 43 stations are equipped with such facilities, thus there will be no difficulties present for the old and handicapped. Barrier-free facilities include lifts, ramps, a tactile guidance system and wider faregates. These barrier-free facilities will be included in all future LRT stations.

Lines

Bukit Panjang LRT (BPLRT)

The Bukit Panjang LRT Line (BPLRT) is the first light rail line in Singapore. Spanning 7.6 km and consisting of 13 stations, the entire line opened in 1999 and is the first and only LRT line to be operated by SMRT Trains.

Sengkang LRT (SKLRT)

The Sengkang LRT (SKLRT) is a 10.7 km light rail line which partially opened on 18 January 2003. It is part of the LRT system together with the other two lines. The East Loop has 5 stations, all operational, from Compassvale to Ranggung whereas the West Loop has 8 stations from Cheng Lim to Renjong. On 27 June 2015, Kupang opened, making it the last station on the Sengkang LRT to be opened. The completion of several new residential developments in the area deemed it suitable to operate after 12 years.

Punggol LRT (PGLRT)

The Punggol LRT (PGLRT) is a light rail line in Singapore within the LRT system together with the other two lines. Its first phase, which comprises a 10.3 km light rail line with 15 stations, began operating on 29 January 2005 (with the exception of Oasis, which was opened on 15 June 2007 and Damai, which was opened on 20 June 2011) whereas Nibong, Sumang and Soo Teck were opened on 29 June 2014, the rest of the stations are not opened as Punggol was halfway developed. Subsequently, Sam Kee opened on 29 February 2016, Punggol Point opened on 29 December 2016 while Samudera opened on 31 March 2017 as the area around the stations became more developed. Teck Lee will be opening in tandem with the developments around the area.

Rolling stock

The trains on the LRT system are fitted with rubber tyres, rather than steel wheels, on specially-constructed guideways from which its power is also sourced. All cars are fully automated and driverless, and are controlled from their respective depots.

Signalling
All lines are capable of fully automatic operation, where they can operate driverless and unattended.

The following list documents the systems:

Depots

The LRT system consists of two depots, which run the maintenance, inspection, train overhaul facilities, and house the cars overnight. The Ten Mile Junction Depot houses cars for Bukit Panjang LRT, and the Sengkang Depot houses cars for the Sengkang LRT and Punggol LRT, together with the North East Line of the Mass Rapid Transit (MRT).

Fares and ticketing

The Light Rail Transit uses the same ticketing system as the Mass Rapid Transit, accepting the contactless EZ-Link smart card and tourist passes. Single-trip tickets are not sold; fares can only be purchased via contactless card (EZ-Link or tourist pass, both stored-value cards). 

Instead of using turnstile faregates, all stations on the Bukit Panjang LRT Line now use retractable faregates instead which is faster and easier and the replacement was completed in 2017.

Safety
By 2018, glass and steel platform barriers were installed at all 43 LRT stations to prevent people from falling onto the tracks. Unlike the ones in overground MRT stations, the LRT structures will not have sliding doors but fixed openings. The barriers have been erected at Choa Chu Kang and Bukit Panjang LRT stations in anticipation of higher commuter traffic with the opening of Downtown Line 2. This was followed by the rest of the stations on the Bukit Panjang and Sengkang-Punggol LRT lines in 2018.

The installation of these barriers was completed at all LRT stations in 2017.

See also
 List of Singapore LRT stations
 Mass Rapid Transit
 Transport in Singapore
 Rail transport in Singapore

Notes

References

External links

 
 
 

Light Rail Transit (Singapore)